Balsam Mountain may refer to:
Balsam Mountain (Ulster County, New York) in the Catskills
Balsam Mountain (Greene County, New York) in the Catskills
Balsam Lake Mountain in the Catskills in New York
Balsam Cap in the Catskills in New York
Great Balsam Mountains off the Blue Ridge Parkway in North Carolina